Standrod is an unincorporated community in extreme northwestern Box Elder County, Utah, United States, very close to the state line with Idaho. Standrod is a rural community that is reached primarily by dirt roads. The residents of Standrod primarily rely on agriculture.  The community is in the area of the Raft River Mountains. The climate of the area has four distinct seasons that occur in the northern Great Basin area.

Standrod was first settled in 1892.  In 1898 a school house was built, placed deliberately on the state line so it was half in Idaho and half in Utah.  The town was named for a judge in Idaho.

Notes

External links
Box Elder County history

Populated places established in 1892
Unincorporated communities in Box Elder County, Utah
Unincorporated communities in Utah